Peter Esenwein (born 7 December 1967 in Göppingen) is a German javelin thrower.

In the 2004 Summer Olympics he was eliminated in the first round of the javelin throw competition.

He finished sixth at the 2006 European Championships and third at the 2006 World Athletics Final.

His personal best throw is 87.20 metres, achieved in May 2004 in Rehlingen. This ranked him fourth among German javelin (new implement) throwers, behind Raymond Hecht, Boris Henry and Peter Blank.   All but Hecht were displaced by the new crop of German throwers in 2017 and 2018, Johannes Vetter, Thomas Röhler and Andreas Hofmann.

Achievements

Seasonal bests by year
1997 - 85.60
1998 - 84.17
2000 - 84.79
2001 - 81.74
2002 - 82.97
2003 - 83.03
2004 - 87.20
2005 - 77.20
2006 - 85.30
2007 - 82.78
2008 - 82.72
2009 - 79.15
2010 - 77.47
2012 - 75.75
2013 - 74.15

External links

1967 births
Living people
German male javelin throwers
Athletes (track and field) at the 2004 Summer Olympics
Olympic athletes of Germany
Competitors at the 1995 Summer Universiade
People from Göppingen
Sportspeople from Stuttgart (region)
21st-century German people